Extravaganza: Live at the Mirage is the first live music video title by singer and actress Cher. Released by Sony BMG in 1992, it contained footage from Cher's two Heart of Stone Tour specials filmed at Mirage Hotel in Las Vegas in 1990. It featured tracks from Cher and  Heart of Stone albums alongside various covers.

Formats
The show was originally broadcast on CBS as a Cher concert special in 1992. It was then released on VHS and LaserDisc in the same year. In UK the VHS version has an alternative opening, the same opening used on tour. The CBS Broadcast version was finally released on DVD in 2005 with many extras and further bonus songs that did not make the broadcast but were included on the VHS version.

Track listing
VHS version
"I'm No Angel"
"Hold On"
"We All Sleep Alone"
"Bang Bang"
"I Found Someone"
"Perfection"
"Tougher Than the Rest"
"After All"
"Take It to the Limit"
"If I Could Turn Back Time"
"Many Rivers to Cross"
"The Fire Down Below"
"Takin' It to the Streets"

DVD version

Other information 
"Hold On", "Many Rivers to Cross" and "Tougher Than The Rest" were the bonus songs in the DVD. The show shown on the DVD release also uses different angles and shots in various places compared to the original VHS release.

See also 
Cher: Music video and DVD videography
Heart of Stone Tour
Live at the Mirage

External links
Extravaganza: Live at the Mirage – The New York Post Review

References

Cher video albums
1992 video albums
1992 live albums
Live video albums
Albums recorded at the Mirage